The 2023 Masters Tournament will be the 87th edition of the Masters Tournament and the first of the men's four major golf championships held in 2023. It is scheduled to be played from April 6–9 at Augusta National Golf Club in Augusta, Georgia.

Course

The scorecard below will be for the 2023 Tournament. Pictures from Eureka Earth had earlier shown a new, longer tee box on the Par 5 13th Azalea, but the decision to lengthen the hole was not confirmed until the Club released its annual media guide in early February.

Field
Participation in the Masters Tournament is by invitation only, and the tournament has the smallest field of the major championships. There are a number of criteria by which invitations are awarded, including all past winners, recent major champions, leading finishers in the previous year's majors, leading players on the PGA Tour in the previous season, winners of full-point tournaments on the PGA Tour during the previous 12 months, leading players in the Official World Golf Ranking, and some leading amateurs.

Criteria
Throughout much of 2022, there had been discussion in the media about whether there would be changes to any of the major championship's exemption and qualification criteria following the launch of LIV Golf, and the subsequent response of the PGA Tour to suspend participants in the new series. On December 20, 2022, Augusta National announced that existing criteria for the Masters Tournament would remain unaltered and qualifying LIV players would be invited. This list details the qualification criteria for the 2023 Masters Tournament and the players who have qualified under them; any additional criteria under which players qualified are indicated in parentheses.

1. All past winners of the Masters Tournament

Fred Couples
Sergio García
Dustin Johnson (12,18)
Zach Johnson
Bernhard Langer
Sandy Lyle
Hideki Matsuyama (13,17,18)
Phil Mickelson (4)
Larry Mize
José María Olazábal
Patrick Reed
Scottie Scheffler (5,12,13,16,17,18)
Charl Schwartzel (12)
Adam Scott (17,18)
Vijay Singh
Jordan Spieth (16,17,18)
Bubba Watson
Mike Weir
Tiger Woods
Danny Willett (12)

Past winners not expected to play: Tommy Aaron, Jack Burke Jr., Ángel Cabrera, Charles Coody, Ben Crenshaw, Nick Faldo, Raymond Floyd, Trevor Immelman, Jack Nicklaus, Mark O'Meara, Gary Player, Craig Stadler, Tom Watson, Ian Woosnam, Fuzzy Zoeller

2. Recent winners of the U.S. Open (2018–2022)

Bryson DeChambeau
Matt Fitzpatrick (17,18)
Brooks Koepka (4)
Jon Rahm (16,17,18)
Gary Woodland

3. Recent winners of The Open Championship (2018–2022)

Shane Lowry (12,18)
Francesco Molinari
Collin Morikawa (4,12,17,18)
Cameron Smith (5,12,17,18)

4. Recent winners of the PGA Championship (2018–2022)

Justin Thomas (5,12,17,18)

5. Recent winners of The Players Championship (2021–2023)

6. The winner of the gold medal at the Olympic Games

7. The winner and runner-up in the 2022 U.S. Amateur Championship

Sam Bennett (a)
Ben Carr (a)

8. The winner of the 2022 Amateur Championship

Aldrich Potgieter (a)

9. The winner of the 2022 Asia-Pacific Amateur Championship

Harrison Crowe (a)

10. The winner of the 2023 Latin America Amateur Championship

Mateo Fernández de Oliveira (a)

11. The winner of the 2022 U.S. Mid-Amateur Golf Championship

Matthew McClean (a)

12. The leading 12 players, and those tying for 12th place, from the 2022 Masters Tournament

Cameron Champ
Corey Conners (17,18)
Im Sung-jae (17,18)
Rory McIlroy (14,16,17,18)
Will Zalatoris (13,15,16,17,18)

13. The leading four players, and those tying for fourth place, in the 2022 U.S. Open

14. The leading four players, and those tying for fourth place, in the 2022 Open Championship

Tommy Fleetwood (18)
Viktor Hovland (17,18)
Cameron Young (15,17,18)

15. The leading four players, and those tying for fourth place, in the 2022 PGA Championship

Mito Pereira (18)

16. Winners of PGA Tour events between the 2022
Masters Tournament and the 2023 Masters Tournament

Keegan Bradley (18)
Sam Burns (17,18)
Patrick Cantlay (17,18)
Tony Finau (17,18)
Russell Henley (18)
Max Homa (17,18)
Mackenzie Hughes (18)
Billy Horschel (17,18)
Kim Si-woo
Tom Kim (18)
Chris Kirk
Kurt Kitayama (18)
Lee Kyoung-hoon (17,18)
Taylor Moore
Séamus Power (18)
Justin Rose
J. T. Poston (17)
Xander Schauffele (17,18)
Adam Svensson

17. All players who qualified for the 2022 Tour Championship

Brian Harman (18)
Tom Hoge (18)
Joaquín Niemann (18)
Scott Stallings
Sepp Straka (18)
Sahith Theegala (18)
Aaron Wise (18)

18. The leading 50 players on the Official World Golf Ranking as of December 31, 2022

Abraham Ancer
Ryan Fox
Talor Gooch
Tyrrell Hatton
Kevin Kisner
Jason Kokrak
Adrian Meronk
Kevin Na
Alex Norén
Louis Oosthuizen
Thomas Pieters
Harold Varner III

19. The leading 50 players on the Official World Golf Ranking as of March 27, 2023

20. Special invitations

Kazuki Higa
Gordon Sargent (a)

Notes

References

External links

2023
2023 in golf
2023 in American sports
2023 in Georgia (U.S. state)
April 2023 sports events in the United States